Jean-Louis Fabiani (born May 30, 1951) is a French sociologist, professor of sociology and social anthropology at the Central European University, and the director of studies at the Centre d'études sociologiques et politiques Raymond Aron at the École des Hautes Études en Sciences Sociales.

Education

Fabiani aggregated in philosophy at the École Normale Supérieure in 1974 before graduating with his PhD in 1980 at the École des hautes études en sciences sociales under the supervision of Pierre Bourdieu.

Work

Fabiani's research has addressed the study of what he calls "configurations of knowledge" understood as the ways in which disciplines and scientific institutions are built and how they change. This problem was the subject of his book Les philosophes de la République (1998) published by Les Éditions de Minuit in the collection "Sens commun" (compiled by Pierre Bourdieu).

From 1988 to 1991, Fabiani was the director of regional cultural affairs in Corsica. In January 2015, Fabiani was appointed by Fleur Pellerin as an Officier des arts et lettres in recognition for his “significant contributions to the arts and literature” of France.

Teaching

Fabiani is presently a senior professor at the Central European University in the department of sociology and social anthropology, a position he has held since 2011, as well as full professor and director of studies at the École des hautes études en sciences sociales. In 2014, Fabiani was the Fernand Braudel Fellow at the European University Institute in the department of history and civilization.

Fabiani has held several visiting professorships, most notably at the sociology departments of the University of California, San Diego, the University of Chicago, the Université de Montréal and the University of Michigan.

Bibliography

Books in French

 L'Education populaire et le théâtre : Le public d'Avignon en action (Presses universitaires de Grenoble, 2008  
 Qu'est-ce qu'un philosophe français? : La vie sociale des concepts (1880-1980) (Editions de l'Ecole des Hautes Etudes en Sciences Sociales, 2010)  
 La sociologie comme elle s'écrit : De Bourdieu à Latour (Editions de l'Ecole des Hautes Etudes en Sciences Sociales, 2015)  
 Pierre Bourdieu. Un structuralisme héroïque (Seuil, 2016) 

Books in English
 Pierre Bourdieu: A Heroic Structuralism (Brill, 2020) 

Selected Articles in English
 "The audience and its legend: A sociological analysis of the Avignon festival." The Journal of Arts Management, Law, and Society 32, no. 4 (2003): 265–277.
 "Should the sociological analysis of art festivals be Neo-Durkheimian?" Durkheimian Studies/Etudes durkheimiennes 11 (2005): 49–66.
 "R. K. Merton in France: Foucault, Bourdieu, Latour and the invention of mainstream sociology in Paris," in Concepts and the social order: Robert K. Merton and the future of sociology edited by  Yehuda Elkana, András Szi-guetti and Gyorgy Lissauer. Budapest-New York: CEU University Press, 2011.

References

External links
 Central European University: Academic Profile of Jean-Louis Fabiani
 ResearchGate Profile of Jean-Louis Fabiani

1951 births
People from Algiers
Living people
École Normale Supérieure alumni
School for Advanced Studies in the Social Sciences alumni
Sociologists of science
Sociologists of art
Academic staff of the School for Advanced Studies in the Social Sciences
Academic staff of Central European University
Officiers of the Ordre des Arts et des Lettres
Fernand Braudel Fellows
Network scientists